Maximilian Marterer was the defending champion but lost in the quarterfinals to Stefano Travaglia.

Tallon Griekspoor won the title after defeating Zsombor Piros 6–3, 6–2 in the final.

Seeds

Draw

Finals

Top half

Bottom half

References

Main draw
Qualifying draw

Slovak Open II - 1
2021 Singles